Events from the year 1779 in Ireland.

Incumbent
Monarch: George III

Events
Armed Volunteers demonstrate in Dublin for free trade between Ireland and England. This demand for amendment of the Navigation Acts is quickly granted by the British government.
Grand Canal opens to traffic between Dublin and Sallins.
Spike Island, County Cork, is acquired by the government to form part of the defences of Cork Harbour.
New Church of Ireland Christ Church Cathedral, Waterford, completed.

Births
22 January – Charles O'Neill, 1st Earl O'Neill, landowner and politician (died 1841).
February – Richard Carmichael, surgeon (died 1849).
30 March – Antoine Ó Raifteiri, "last of the wandering bards" (died 1835).
16 April – Patrick Kelly, Roman Catholic Bishop of Waterford and Lismore (died 1829).
28 May – Thomas Moore, poet, singer, songwriter and entertainer (died 1852).
17 August – William Corbet, member of the United Irishmen, soldier, Commander-in-Chief of French forces in Greece (died 1842).
3 November – Hugh Gough, 1st Viscount Gough, British Field Marshal (died 1869).
Arthur Brooke Faulkner, physician and writer (died 1845).
John Oldham, mechanical engineer (died 1840).
Thomas Ussher, Royal Navy officer (died 1848).
Possible date – Julia Glover née Betterton, comic actress (died 1850).

Deaths
April – Anthony Foster, lawyer and politician (born 1705).
18 October – Patrick d'Arcy, mathematical physicist and soldier in France (born 1725).
10 December – Thomas Fortescue, politician (born 1744).
Risteárd Buidhe Kirwan, soldier and duellist (died 1708).
Thomas Newburgh, poet (born c.1695).
Thomas Tennison, lawyer and politician (born 1707).

References

 
Years of the 18th century in Ireland
Ireland
1770s in Ireland